Admiral Mackenzie may refer to:

Hugh Mackenzie (Royal Navy officer) (1913–1996), British Royal Navy vice admiral
James George Mackenzie (c. 1803–1879), British Royal Navy rear admiral
Thomas Mackenzie (Royal Navy officer) (1753–1813)
Thomas MacKenzie (Russian admiral) (1740–1786), Imperial Russian Navy rear admiral